Abū Yūsuf Ya‘qūb Ibn as-Sikkīt was a philologist tutor to the son of the Abbasid caliph Al-Mutawakkil and a great grammarian and scholar of poetry of the al-Kūfah school.  He was punished on the orders of the caliph and died between 857 and 861.

Life

He was the son of al-Sikkīt, a philologist of the Kūfī school of grammar, a man of science, and an associate of the scholars al-Kisā’ī and al-Farrā’. Where the father excelled in poetry and linguistics, the son excelled in grammar. His father originated from the village of Dawraq, Ahwaz Khuzestan (Iran),

Ya‘qūb was a scholar of Baghdād, which followed the Kūfī school tradition in grammar, Qur’anic science and poetry. He studied and recorded the pure Arabic language from the Desert Arabs.  He tutored the sons of al-Mutawakkil, who were Al-Muntasir and Al-Mu'tazz.

Ya‘qūb’s surname was Abū Yūsuf and his son, Yūsuf, was a court companion and personally close to the caliph al-Mu‘taḍid.

He was a disciple of Abū ‘Amr al-Shaybānī, Muḥammad ibn Muhanna, and Muḥammad ibn Subh ibn as-Sammāq. He taught the philology of al-Asmaʿi, Abū Ubaidah, and al-Farrā’.

Isḥāq al-Nadīm records that he was a pupil of Naṣrān al-Khurāsāni.  Naṣrān had transmitted the poetry of al-Kumayt with ‘Umar ibn Bukayr and Ibn al-Sikkīt, who had memorised Naṣrān's books had a bitter disagreement about Naṣrān‘s teachings with the Kūfī scholar, al-Ṭūsī. 

The account of al-Sikkīt, related by al-Nadim through the classical isnād source-system, cites the narrator-chain of Abū Sa‘īd,  Abū Bakr ibn Durayd and al-Riyāshī, in an account illustrative of the active intellectual exchange between the two rival schools of Baṣrah and Kūfah in the 9th century.  A group of wārraqūn of al-Kūfah gathered for a reading aloud by a warrāq of al-Baṣrah, of Ibn al-Sikkīt’s Book of Logic. Al-Riyāshī was at the event and attested that Ibn al-Sikkīt had told him, that he had learned the vernacular dialects of Southern ‘Irāq from Ḥarashat al-Ḍibāb and Aklat al-Yarābī, and they had derived theirs from the people of al-Sawād. He mentions examples of words such as “akalah al-kuwāmīkh” and “al-shawārīz."

The tests of rivalry between schools is illustrated in another account given by al-Nadim, told as a kind of cautionary tale. When al-Athram, a young scholar from al-Baṣrah, challenges Ya‘qūb ibn al-Sikkīt, a senior scholar of al-Kūfah school, on a verse by the poet al-Rā’ī, he clearly breaks the etiquette code that always ranks seniority above juniority.

Works

 Al-Alfāz (‘Pronunciations’, or ‘Dialects’);
 Iṣlāh al-Mantiq (‘Correction of Logic’);; abridged by Ibn al-Maghribī, and revised by the Yaḥyā ibn ʿAlī al-Tibrīzī Ibn as-Sīrāfi, produced an educative anthology from excerpted verses.
 Az-Zibrij (‘Ornamentation’);
 Al-Bath (‘Investigation’
 Al-Amthāl (‘Book of Proverbs’);
 Al-Maqṣūr wa al-Mamdūd (‘The Shortened and the Lengthened’);
 Al-Muḍakkar wa al-Mu’annath (‘Masculine and Feminine’);
 Al-Ajnās Kabīr (‘The Great Book, Categories’);
 Al-Farq (‘Differentiation’);
 As-Sarj wa al-Lijām (‘Saddle and Bridle’);
 Fa‘ala wa-Af‘ala;
 Al-Ḥašarāt (‘Book of Insects’);
 (‘Voices’);
 Al-Aḍdād (‘Contraries’);
 An-Nabāt wa aš-Šajar (‘Trees and Plants’);
 Al-Wuḥūš (‘Wild Beasts’);
 Al-Ibil (‘The Camel’);
 An-Nawādir (‘Rare Forms’);
 Ma‘ānī aš-Ši‘r al-Kabīr (‘Large Book, The Meaning of Poetry’);
 Ma‘ānī aš-Ši‘r as-Ṣigar (‘Small book, The Meaning of Poetry’) ;
 Saraqāt aš-Šu‘arā’ wa mā Ittafaqū ‘alaihi (‘Plagiarisms and Agreements of Poets’);
 Al-Qalb wa’l-Abdāl (‘Permutation and Substitution [in grammar]’;
 Al-Maṭnān wa’l-Mabnan wa’l-Mukannan (‘The Dual, the Indeclinable, and the Surnamed’);
Al-Ayyām wa’l-Layālī (‘Days and Nights’);
 ’What Occurs in Poetry and What Is Deleted’;

List of Edited Poets
Nābighah al-Dhubyānī:(edited and abridged by Ibn as-Sikkīt), also edited by al-Sukkarī, al-Aṣma’ī' and al-Ṭūsī.
Ḥuṭay’ah:   also edited by al-Aṣma’ī, Abū ‘Amr al-Shaybānī, al-Sukkarī, and al-Ṭūsī.
Al-Nābighah al-Ja‘dī: also edited by al-Aṣma’ī, al-Sukkarī, and al-Ṭūsī.
Labīd ibn Rabī‘ah al-‘Āmirī: also edited by Abū ‘Amr al-Shaybānī, al-Aṣma’ī, al-Sukkarī, and al-Ṭūsī.
Tamīm ibn Ubayy ibn Muqbil: also edited by Abū ‘Amr [al-Shaybānī], al-Aṣma’ī, al-Sukkarī, and al-Ṭūsī.
Muhalhil ibn Rabī‘ah: also edited by al-Sukkarī and al-Aṣma’ī.
Al-A‘shā al-Kabīr, Maymūn ibn Qays, Abū Baṣīr:
 Al-A’shā al-Kabīr: also edited by al-Sukkarī, Abū ‘Amr al-Shaybānī, al-Aṣma’ī, al-Ṭūsī, and Tha‘lab.
A‘shā Bāhilah ‘Amir ibn al-Ḥārith: also edited by al-Aṣma’ī and al-Sukkarī. 
Bishr ibn Abī Khāzim: also edited by al-Aṣma’ī and al-Sukkarī.
Ḥumayd ibn Thawr al-Rājiz: also edited by al-Sukkarī, al-Aṣma’ī, Abū ‘Amr [al-Shaybānī] and al-Ṭūsī.
Ḥumayd al-Arqaṭ: also edited by al-Sukkarī, al-Aṣma’ī, Abū ‘Amr [al-Shaybānī] and al-Ṭūsī.
Suhaym ibn Wathīl al-Riyāḥī: also edited by al-Sukkarī and al-Aṣma’ī.
Urwah ibn al-Ward: also edited by al-Sukkarī and al-Aṣma’ī.
Al-‘Abbās ibn Mirdās al-Sulamī: also edited by al-Sukkarī and al-Ṭūsī.
Al-Khansa: also edited by Ibn al-A‘rābī, al-Sukkarī, and others.
Al-Kumayt ibn Ma‘rūf: edited by al-Sukkarī and Al-Aṣma’ī, Ibn al-Sikkīt enlarged on it, and scholars quoted him from a chain of scholars through Ibn Kunāsah al-Asadī, Abū Jāzī, Abū al-Mawṣūl and Abū Ṣadaqah, the Banū Asad Tribe. Ibn al-Sikkīt received the poetry of al-Kumayt from Naṣrān his teacher who received it from Abū Ḥafṣ ‘Umar ibn Bukayr.

See also

List of Arab scientists and scholars
Encyclopædia Britannica Online

Notes

References

Bibliography

Year of birth unknown
Year of death uncertain
9th-century deaths
9th-century Arabic writers
9th-century biologists
9th-century botanists
9th-century historians from the Abbasid Caliphate
9th-century linguists
9th-century philologists
9th-century philosophers
9th-century zoologists
Poets from the Abbasid Caliphate
Arabists
Botanists of the medieval Islamic world
Grammarians of Arabic
Grammarians of Kufa
Iraqi entomologists
Iraqi philologists
Linguists from Iraq
Medieval grammarians of Arabic
People from Baghdad
Zoologists of the medieval Islamic world